L. Dean Ifill (born Laurence Dean Ifill, January 5, 1971) is a Canadian actor, director, producer and voiceover artist. He played Basil "Bronco" Davis in the original Degrassi High television series and the made-for-television broadcast School's Out. Bronco was the school president and boyfriend of character Lucy Fernandez, played by Anais Granofsky.

Ifill has produced and directed plays and both television and online commercials geared towards North American youth based upon topics that include HIV / AIDS Awareness, Drug Prevention, Bullying, and Making Healthy Choices. Ifill is also the voice of Burn on the Walt Disney and Jetix animated television series Get Ed.

Filmography

Film

Television

External links
School's Out site from Degrassi.ca
 
 

1971 births
Living people
Canadian male television actors
Black Canadian male actors
Male actors from Toronto